Love Is Beautiful is the tenth album by Japanese band Glay. The album was released on January 31, 2007. It reached #1 on Oricon charts with 193,530 sales.

The album is certified Platinum for shipment of 250,000 copies.

Track listing

Standard Edition

Limited Edition
Bonus DVD track listing
"Rock'n'Roll Swindle's Promotional Video"
"Koi's Promotional Video"
"Scream's Promotional Video"
"Answer's Promotional Video"
"Natsuoto's Promotional Video"
"100 Mankai no Kiss's Promotional Video"
"Love Is Beautiful Road Movie"
The Limited Edition sells with a 32-page booklet at ¥3,800(taxin)

External links
Official website

References

2007 albums
Glay albums